Leonard Howard Levy (June 11, 1913 – February 2, 1993) was an American professional baseball player, coach and scout. He coached in Major League Baseball for the Pittsburgh Pirates for seven seasons (1957–1963).

Biography
Of Jewish descent, Levy was born in Pittsburgh, Pennsylvania. In 1932, he graduated from Taylor Allderdice High School, where he was on the baseball, basketball, and football teams. He started out as a ticket taker at Forbes Field. He became a batboy for the Pirates, and was a catcher in the minor leagues during 1936. During World War II, he was stationed in China with the Marines. He began his coaching career in 1947. He worked as a talent scout from 1951 to 1956.
After his baseball career, Levy opened a car dealership in Pittsburgh.

Levy was later inducted into the Western Pennsylvania Jewish Sports Hall of Fame. He died in Palm Desert, California.

See also
List of Jews in Sports

References

1913 births
1993 deaths
Jewish American baseball coaches
Pittsburgh Pirates coaches
Pittsburgh Pirates scouts
Portsmouth Pirates players
Savannah Indians players
Sportspeople from Pittsburgh
Taylor Allderdice High School alumni
20th-century American Jews
Baseball players from Pittsburgh